Massimo Serato, born Giuseppe Segato, (31 May 1916 – 22 December 1989) was an Italian film actor with a career spanning over 40 years.

Serato was born in Oderzo, Veneto, Italy and started appearing in films in 1938. He played leading roles in several historical dramas and sword and sandal epics, mainly Italian, as well as roles in major international films. His notable appearances include Piccolo mondo antico (1941),The Naked Maja (1958), David and Goliath (1960), The Loves of Hercules (1960),  El Cid (1961),  55 Days at Peking (1963) Camille 2000 (1969) and Don't Look Now (1973). In 1947 he won a Nastro d'Argento for Best Supporting Actor for his performance in the neorealist war-drama film The Sun Still Rises.

He had an affair with the actress Anna Magnani who bore him a son, Luca, whom she affectionately called Cellino.  Luca contracted polio at an early age; - " In time he was able to walk with steel braces but [he] spent much of his time in a wheelchair."

Serato died in Rome in 1989.

Selected filmography

 Inventiamo l'amore (1938) - Un altro giocatore nella sala da biliardo
 Le Père Lebonnard (1939) - Un giovanetto al ballo (uncredited)
 L'ispettore Vargas (1940)
 Piccolo mondo antico (1941) - Franco Maironi
 Due cuori sotto sequestro (1941) - Il compositore
 L'amore canta (1941) - Alberto
 L'uomo venuto dal mare (1942) - Il marinaio
 I sette peccati (1942) - Mario Venier
 Luisa Sanfelice (1942) - Ferdinando Ferri
 Giacomo the Idealist (1943) - Giacomo Lanzavecchia
 The Materassi Sisters (1944) - Remo, il nipote
 In High Places (1945) - Giorgio Zanetti
 The Sun Still Rises (1946) - Major Heinrich
 Sangue a Ca' Foscari (1946) - cavaliere della Rosa
 L'apocalisse (1947)
 The Courier of the King (1947) - Maurice Croisenois
 La revanche de Baccarat (1947)
 The Lady of the Camellias (1947) - Alexandre Dumas fils (prologue)
 Rocambole (1947)
 Il principe ribelle (1947) - Francesco di Sant'Agata
 I cavalieri dalle maschere nere (1948) - Il contino de la Motte
 The Dance of Death (1948) - Stéphane / Stefano
 Monastero di Santa Chiara (1949) - Rudolf, ufficiale delle SS
 Il mondo vuole così (1949) - Alberto
 The Pirates of Capri (1949) - Baron Holstein
 Marechiaro (1949) - Luca Salvatori
 Flying Squadron (1949) - Ufficiale D'aviazione
 Sunday in August (1950) - Roberto
 Fugitive Lady (1950) - Jim West
 The Thief of Venice (1950) - Il grande inquisitore Garbia
 The Rival of the Empress (1951) - Orloff - Italian language version (voice)
 Love and Blood (1951) - Peppuccio detto Peppe
 Shadows Over Naples (1951) - Peppuccio
 Tragic Spell (1951) - Berto
 Without a Flag (1951) - Leutnant Morassi
 I due derelitti (1951) - Ramon
 Anita Garibaldi (1952) - (uncredited)
 Milady and the Musketeers (1952) - Comte de Rochefort
 La figlia del diavolo (1952) - Adolfo Santagata
 Red Love (1952) - Simone Sole
 The Merchant of Venice (1953) - Antonio
 I Piombi di Venezia (1953) - Orsenigo
 Gioventù alla sbarra (1953) - Gigi
 Eager to Live (1953) - Massimo Fontana
 The Man from Cairo (1953) - Basil Constantine
 Lucrèce Borgia (1953) - Alfonso of Aragon
 The Story of William Tell (1953) - Hermann Gessler
 Il Conte di Sant'Elmo (1953) - Conte di Sant'Elmo
 Public Opinion (1954) - Massimo Gorini
 Pietà per chi cade (1954) - Livio Vanini
 Madame du Barry (1954) - Choiseul
 Loves of Three Queens (1954) - Paride (segment: The Face That Launched a Thousand Ships)
 L'eterna femmina (1954)
 Foglio di via (1954) - Andrea
 Cartouche (1955) - Henri de Vauboranche
 The Widow (1955) - Vittorio
 Il falco d'oro (1955) - Massimo Montefalco
 Il piccolo vetraio (1955) - barone de la Motte
 Mermaid of Naples (1956) - Salvatore Aiello
 Tormento d'amore (1956) - Pietro Martínez
 Supreme Confession (1956) - Marco Neri
 La trovatella di Milano (1956)
 Peppino, le modelle e chella là (1957) - Carlo Rosani
 La grande ombra (1957) - Franco Donati
 The Silent Enemy (1958) - Forzellini
 Slave Women of Corinth (1958) - Quinto Rufo
 The Naked Maja (1958) - Conte Rodrigo Sanchez
 Captain Falcon (1958) - Baron Oddo di Serra
 The Sword and the Cross (1958) - Anan
 Cavalier in Devil's Castle (1959) - Capitano Ugone di Collefeltro
 Tunis Top Secret (1959) - Nikos
 The Magistrate (1959) - Ugo
 The Pirate and the Slave Girl  (1959) - Roberto Diego
 David and Goliath (1960) - Abner
 The Loves of Hercules (1960) - Licos
 Queen of the Pirates (1960) - Cesare di Santacroce
  (1960) - Al
 Femmine di lusso (1960) - Sicilian Nobleman
 Constantine and the Cross (1961) - Maxentius
 El Cid (1961) - Fanez
 Pontius Pilate (1962) -Nicodemus
 Venus Against the Son of Hercules (1962) - Antarus
 The Secret Mark of D'Artagnan (1962) - Cardinal Richelieu
 Hypnosis (1962) - Georg von Cramer
 The Invincible Masked Rider (1963) - Don Rodrigo
 55 Days at Peking (1963) - Menotti Garibaldi
 Samson and the Slave Queen (1963) - Garcia de Higuera
 Goliath and the Rebel Slave (1963) - Marcius
 Gli invincibili sette (1963) - Axel
 Brennus, Enemy of Rome (1963) - Marcus Furius Camillus
 Jacob and Esau (1963) - Ismaele - Ishmael
  (1964) - Chefredakteur
 Samson vs. the Giant King (1964) - Czar Nicola Nicolajevic
 Hero of Rome (1964) - Lucius Tarquinius Superbus
 The Lion of Thebes (1964) - Tutmes
 Desafío en Río Bravo (1964) - Leo
 Gladiators Seven (1964) - Baxo
 La Celestina P... R... (1965) - Marcello
 Challenge of the Gladiator (1965) - Senator Lucio Quintilio
 100.000 dollari per Ringo (1965) - Guy
 The 10th Victim (1965) - Lawyer Rossi
 Super Seven Calling Cairo (1965) - Alex
  (1966)
 The Almost Perfect Crime (1966) - Preston
 Wild, Wild Planet (1966) - Mr. Nurmi
 The Lost Woman (1966) - D. Rafael Valcálcer
 00/ciak operazione mondo (1966)
 The Honey Pot (1967) - The Pretender (scenes deleted)
 The Strange Night (1967) - ing. Pariante
 Il magnifico texano (1967) - Blackie Stark
 È stato bello amarti (1968) - Luca
 Catch as Catch Can (1968) - Agent
 Camille 2000 (1969) - Armand's father
  (1969) - Crusich
 The Naughty Cheerleader (1970) - Capitano di Montecucculi
 The Gamblers (1970) - Del Isolla
 Il divorzio (1970) - Mario Gherardi
 Cloud of Dust... Cry of Death... Sartana Is Coming (1970) - Sheriff Jim Manassas
 Edipeon (1970)
 La califfa (1970) - L'industriale fallito
 Historia de una traición (1971) - Hugo
 Il ritorno del gladiatore più forte del mondo (1971) - Caio Appio Quintilliano
 Dead Men Ride (1971) - Emiliano
 Il sergente Klems (1971) - French General
 Who Killed the Prosecutor and Why? (1972) - Uncle Fifi
 Un apprezzato professionista di sicuro avvenire (1972) - Bishop
 Beau Masque (1972) - Valério
 Number one (1973) - Mino Cattani
 Women in Cell Block 7 (1973) - Prison Director
 Don't Look Now (1973) - Bishop Barbarrigo
 Salvo D'Acquisto (1974) - Halder
 Autopsy (1975) - Gianni Sanna
 Cattivi pensieri (1976) - Carlo Bocconi
 Il ginecologo della mutua (1977) - Doctor Guido Lo Bianco
 Convoy Busters (1978) - Degan
 The Bloodstained Shadow (1978) - Count Pedrazzi
 The Humanoid (1979) - Great Brother
 Killer Nun (1979) - Dr. Poirret
 Eden no sono (1980) - Alessandra's Father
 Estigma (1980)
 Pin il monello (1982)
 Via degli specchi (1983) - Councillor Bianchi
 Nana (1983) - Faucherie
 Il ragazzo di campagna (1984) - Rower
 Saving Grace (1986) - Monsignor Betti
 Le lunghe ombre (1987)
 32 dicembre (1988) - Ferruccio, il fidanzato (segment "La gialla farfalla")
 Singolo (1989)
 Fratelli d'Italia (1989)
 Viaggio di nozze in giallo (1990)
 L'avvoltoio può attendere (1991) - Prince (final film role)

References

External links
 
 Filmography

1916 births
1989 deaths
People from Oderzo
Italian male film actors
Nastro d'Argento winners
20th-century Italian male actors